The 1991 Japanese Touring Car Championship season was the 7th edition of the series. It began at Sportsland SUGO on 19 May and finished after six events at Fuji Speedway on 10 November. The championship was won by Masahiro Hasemi, driving for Hasemi Motorsport.

Teams & Drivers

Calendar
Overall winner in bold.

Championship Standings
Points were awarded 20, 15, 12, 10, 8, 6, 4, 3, 2, 1 to the overall top 10 as well as top 10 finishers in each class, with no bonus points for pole positions or fastest laps. All scores counted towards the championship. In cases where teammates tied on points, the driver who completed the greater distance during the season was given the higher classification.

References

Japanese Touring Car Championship
Japanese Touring Car Championship seasons